An American Haunting is a 2005 supernatural horror film written and directed by Courtney Solomon and starring Donald Sutherland, Sissy Spacek, James D'Arcy, and Rachel Hurd-Wood. The film was previewed at the AFI Film Festival on November 5, 2005 and was released in the UK on April 14, 2006 with follow-up in US theaters on May 5. The film is an international co-production between the United Kingdom, Canada, Romania, and the United States.

The film is based on the novel The Bell Witch: An American Haunting by Brent Monahan. The events in the novel are based on the legend of the Bell Witch. The film switches from the 21st century to the 19th, and features a subplot about a recently divorced mother (Susan Almgren) whose daughter (Isabelle Almgren-Doré) is going through something like the same experience as Betsy Bell.

Plot
A terrified young girl runs through the forest and into her house to escape from an unseen threat. When she sees the Bell Witch, a ghost that takes the form of a girl, she awakens with a scream. Her mother dismisses it as a dream and reminds her that this is her week to visit her father. The mother goes to her desk and picks up a binder full of old letters, with a note from someone who claims to be an ancestor. The letters appear written in 19th-century script.

The story goes back to the early 19th-century to show the Bell Witch's story. John Bell is taken to church court and found guilty of theft of a woman's land. The church releases him with the verdict that his loss of honor is sufficient punishment. The offended party, Kate Batts, is infamous in the village due to claims of witchcraft.

Strange events begin to occur and John believes that Batts cursed him. Betsy starts to look very sick and the haunting worsens. Her young teacher, Richard Powell, notices the change in Betsy's behavior. The Bell family tells him they fear that the cause is paranormal. Powell attempts to prove that this is impossible because spirits don't exist. It is implied that Richard is in love with Betsy.

Richard stays in the Bell home to observe Betsy's behavior. His theory is proven wrong when he witnesses Betsy dangling in the air, as if someone is holding her up by her hair. Betsy is sexually assaulted by the spirit. John loses his sanity and sees many forms of the Bell Witch. John asks Kate Batts to kill him and remove her curse. She refuses and tells him that he cursed himself. John tries to kill himself, but the spirit stops him.

Betsy is struck with a revelation that the attacks on her and her father are caused by a supernatural being who was born out of her innocence. She needed to "remember" that the true cause of her pain is her father's child sexual abuse of her. Lucy, Betsy's mother, has the same revelation because she witnessed the sexual assault, which she and Betsy repressed. Betsy poisons her now bed-ridden father with medicine while her mother watches. Betsy is then seen at her father's grave, and she is never haunted again.

In present day, the mother's daughter says her father has come to take her for their weekend stay. She sends her daughter to her ex-husband, who is waiting outside. Betsy's ghost suddenly appears and looks ominous. The mother realizes Betsy is trying to warn her that something is amiss between her daughter and her ex-husband.

She runs out of her house and catches a glimpse of her daughter's worried face peering out from the car window as it drives away; the implication is that the father is sexually abusing her. She runs after her ex-husband's car, frantically yelling his name.

Cast

Critical reception
An American Haunting was panned by critics, holding a 38/100 rating on Metacritic, indicating "generally unfavorable reviews". Rotten Tomatoes reports a 14% rating from 71 reviews; the consensus states: "Well, it looks good. But wasn't it supposed to be scary?"

See also
The Bell Witch Haunting

References

External links
 
 
 
 
 

2005 films
2005 horror films
2000s ghost films
American haunted house films
American supernatural horror films
British ghost films
British supernatural horror films
Canadian ghost films
Canadian supernatural horror films
2000s English-language films
English-language Canadian films
English-language Romanian films
Films directed by Courtney Solomon
Films scored by Justin Burnett
Films set in the 1810s
Films set in the 19th century
Films set in 2005
Films set in the 21st century
Films set in Tennessee
Films shot in Montreal
Films shot in Romania
Incest in film
Patricide in fiction
Religious horror films
Romanian horror films
American ghost films
Films about child sexual abuse
2000s American films
2000s Canadian films
2000s British films